The 1715 British general election returned members to serve in the House of Commons of the 5th Parliament of Great Britain to be held, after the 1707 merger of the Parliament of England and the Parliament of Scotland. In October 1714, soon after George I had arrived in London after ascending to the throne, he dismissed the Tory cabinet and replaced it with one almost entirely composed of Whigs, as they were responsible for securing his succession. The election of 1715 saw the Whigs win an overwhelming majority in the House of Commons, and afterwards virtually all Tories in central or local government were purged, leading to a period of Whig ascendancy lasting almost fifty years during which Tories were almost entirely excluded from office. The Whigs then moved to impeach Robert Harley, the former Tory first minister. After he was imprisoned in the Tower of London for two years, the case ultimately ended with his acquittal in 1717.

Constituencies
See 1796 British general election for details. The constituencies used were the same throughout the existence of the Parliament of Great Britain.

Dates of the election
The general election was held between 22 January 1715 and 9 March 1715. At this period elections did not take place at the same time in every constituency. The returning officer in each county or parliamentary borough fixed the precise date (see hustings for details of the conduct of the elections).

Results

Seats summary

See also
 5th Parliament of Great Britain
 List of MPs elected in the British general election, 1715
 List of parliaments of Great Britain

References
 British Electoral Facts 1832–1999, compiled and edited by Colin Rallings and Michael Thrasher (Ashgate Publishing Ltd 2000). (For dates of elections before 1832, see the footnote to Table 5.02).

External links
 History of Parliament: Members 1715–1760
 History of Parliament: Constituencies 1715–1760

1715 in politics
General election
1715